Sirras or Sirrhas (d. 390 BC) was a prince, royal member and perhaps prince-regent of Lynkestis (Lyncestis) in Upper Macedonia for his father-in-law King Arrhabaeus ( 423–393 BC). He participated in the Pelopponesian War against Sparta.

Life

Origin
Sirras's origin is disputed, scholars being divided on whether he was of Lynkestian origin, or Illyrian origin or of Upper Macedonian origin with Illyrian ancestors. He may have been a son of the Illyrian chieftain Grabos.

Pelopponesian War

Sirras took part in the Pelopponesian War as an ally of Athens, on the side of Arrhabaeus I of Lyncestis against Perdiccas of Macedonia. In 423 BC Arrhabaeus threw off the Lower Macedonian yoke and became an ally of Sirras. This was reinforced when Sirras married the daughter of Arrhabaeus. At first Sparta avoided involvement in Macedon's war with Arrhabaeus, but in 423 BC they joined an expedition which ended with a retreat by the Macedonians and a brilliantly contrived escape of the Spartans.

After an initial success against Arrhabaeus, Perdiccas persuaded his allies to await the arrival of Illyrian mercenaries. It has been claimed that the Illyrians were under the command of Sirras but this is not supported in historiography (Thucydides did not mention Sirras). Rather the Illyrians opted instead to join the army of Arrhabaeus as they were now allies. The Spartan general, Brasidas who came to support the Macedonians in their advance into the remote regions of Lyncestis, was abandoned by the Macedonians but was able to extract his army of 4,000 from Illyrian encirclement. Thucydides stated that the fear inspired by their warlike character made both Greek armies think it best to retreat. The young Spartans were clearly shaken by the fearsome appearance of the Illyrian forces.

Thucydides reports Brasidas saying that the Illyrians may terrify those with an active imagination, they are formidable in their outward bulk, their loud yelling is unbearable and the brandishing of their weapons in the air has a threatening appearance, but when it comes to real fighting with an opponent who stands his ground they are not what they seemed; they have no regular order that would make them ashamed of deserting their positions when hard pressed; with them flight and attack are equally honourable, and afford no test of courage; their independent mode of fighting never leaving anyone who wants to run away without a fair excuse of doing so.

Thucydides incidentally never makes any mention of Sirras. Basing himself on Aristotle's example of Sirras and Arrhabaeus, N.G.L Hammond concludes that Sirras was a regent to the minor king Arrhabaeus, although Aristotle's quote can also be used to support the case that Sirras was a strategos and Arrhabaeus the king, as Kapetanopoulos argues.

War against Archelaus I of Macedon
At the end of the 5th century BC, Sirras was once again at war with Macedonia over a claim on Lyncestis. Around the end of the reign of Archelaus I of Macedon, ca. 400/399 BC, a new war developed between the two kings over Lyncestis. As in earlier times, Arrhabaeus and Sirras acted together. The results of this war are not known, but later events show that no change happened to the status quo.

Family
Sirras' daughter, Eurydice, married King Amyntas III of Macedon in around 390 BC, probably as part of an alliance against the Illyrians, after he suffered his first defeat by them in 393 BC. One of the sons from this marriage was the future Philip II of Macedon.

References

Bibliography

5th-century BC rulers
Ancient Macedonian generals
Ancient Lyncestians
Illyrian royalty
People of the Peloponnesian War